Proiphys amboinensis (syn. Eurycles amboinensis) was named after the island of Ambiona, now Ambon, in Indonesia. Common names include Cardwell lily and northern Christmas lily (as it usually flowers around Christmas). It is considered native to Thailand, Indonesia (Maluku, Sulawesi, Bali, Lombok, Timor), the Philippines, the Bismark Archipelago, Vanuatu, New Guinea, Queensland and Western Australia. Is also naturalized in Seychelles, Sri Lanka, Solomon Islands, Niue, Society Islands, Caroline Islands and Mariana Islands.

Description
Proiphys amboinensis produces nearly circular leaves followed by attractive scented white flowers with yellow throats. The larger leaves can be over 25 cm long have a leaf stem up to 46 cm long. The pure white flowers are 5 cm wide each with up to 18 flowers in a cluster on stalks over 50 cm. long. Flowering typically begins in late December and is followed by the production of green to blackish capsules 25–30 mm across. Flowering in India is in May-June. The leaves die away in the dry season.

Cultivation and uses
Proiphys amboinensis prefers open, lightly shaded rainforest. It grows quickly after the arrival of the wet season The plant prefers a fairly well shaded position. A good container plant. Needs much water in the growing season. Propagate from seed or lift the bulb.

References

Flora of Papuasia
Flora of Malesia
Amaryllidoideae
Asparagales of Australia